Sherlock Hemlock (who calls himself "the world's greatest detective") is a Muppet character on the PBS series Sesame Street. His catchphrase is "Egad!" which he exclaims whenever he makes a discovery. Sherlock Hemlock was performed by Jerry Nelson.

Prevalence on the show

While Sherlock Hemlock made frequent appearances on the show in the 1970s and 1980s, in recent years he has been phased out in favor of newer characters.  However, like Lefty the Salesman, Guy Smiley, and The Amazing Mumford, he is still a main character on Sesamstrasse, the German version of the show.

Name and appearance

Sherlock Hemlock is an obvious parody of Sherlock Holmes and the stereotypical detective. He wears a deerstalker hat and cloak, which Holmes is often depicted wearing, and often uses a magnifying glass like Holmes. However, his name is also a reference to hemlock, the poisonous plant used to kill the philosopher Socrates.

He appears to have been originally made from a green Anything Muppet.

Famous skits

Sherlock Hemlock is known for his humorous skits in which he tries to solve a mystery, only to discover that he is the culprit. A well-known example of this is the "Chicken Salad Sandwich" skit, originally aired in 1970, which was Sherlock's first appearance. In this skit, Ernie opens his lunch box to find that half of his sandwich is missing, so he asks Sherlock Hemlock to help him figure out who took the missing half. After analyzing some clues like leftover bread crusts ("many people think bread crust is yucky" Sherlock says), they come to the conclusion that Sherlock ate half of the sandwich, and he asks for the other half as his reward. Another memorable sketch was the "Twiddlebug Picnic Case" when he deduced when the Twiddlebugs were having a picnic being interrupted by Herry Monster. One of his most famous segments is the song "X Marks the Spot" in which Sherlock sings about the letter "X."  The imagery of X-ray machines, a flashing railroad crossing, bottles of poison, and danger signs frightened many young viewers.

Sherlock Hemlock starred in all of the episodes of a former recurring Sesame Street segment, "Mysterious Theater" (hosted by Vincent Twice Vincent Twice), which is spoof of the TV series Mystery! (once hosted by Vincent Price). In these sketches, he is aided by a trusted companion, Watson (a dog performed by Kevin Clash), a spoof of Sherlock Holmes's companion, Dr. Watson. Watson frequently solved the case long before Hemlock, but is unable to communicate this to his master, who wouldn't find what Watson discovered until the end of each segment (very similar to Inspector Gadget).

Sesame Street books featuring Sherlock Hemlock
The following Sesame Street books feature Sherlock Hemlock as a main character:

Sherlock Hemlock and the Great Twiddlebug Mystery: or The Mystery of the Terrible Mess in My Friend's Front Yard (by Betty Lou as Told to Sir Arthur Conan Rubberducque) (Whitman Publishing, 1972) written by Revena Dwight and illustrated by Jolly Roger Bradfield (A Whitman Tell-a-Tale Book by the same duo that created The Together Book)
Ernie the Cave King and Sherlock the Smart Person in The Invention of Paper (Whitman Publishing, 1975) by Daniel Wilcox
The Case of the Missing Duckie (Western Publishing, 1981) written by Linda Hayward and illustrated by Maggie Swanson. 
Sherlock Hemlock and the Creatures from Outer Space (Western Publishing, 1981) written by Ray Sipherd and illustrated by Sammis McLean.

External links
 

Sesame Street Muppet characters
Fictional private investigators
Television characters introduced in 1970